Bloodshed is an album by Brazilian death metal band Krisiun. It includes half of the Unmerciful Order EP, as well as eight new tracks (including interludes). Though sometimes considered a compilation, or an EP, the band considers Bloodshed to be an album.

The album was released under the license of Scarecrow Records in 2004, and despite its length, it was wrongly marketed as an EP. Tracks 1–7 and 12 were recorded at Da Tribo Studios, produced by Krisiun and Ciero, and the songs 8–11 were taken from the Unmerciful Order EP released in 1993.

Track listing

Credits
 Moyses Kolesne – guitars
 Max Kolesne – drums
 Alex Camargo – bass, vocals
 David Torelli – cover artwork

External links
 Krisiun's official website

Krisiun albums
2004 compilation albums
Century Media Records compilation albums